Chamaelaucium gracile is a member of the family Myrtaceae endemic to Western Australia.

It is found in the Mid West region of Western Australia where it grows in sandy soils.

References

gracile
Plants described in 1864